"We Praise You" is a song by Bethel Music and Brandon Lake, which was released as the second single from Bethel Music's twelfth live album, Revival's in the Air (2020), on March 6, 2020. The song was written by Lake, Brian Johnson, Matt Redman, Phil Wickham. Brian Johnson also collaborated on the production of the single with Joel Taylor.

Background
The live version of "We Praise You" was recorded at Bethel Church, featuring Brandon Lake as worship leader, was released on March 6, 2020, as the second single from the album, Revival's in the Air, which at the time, was being marketed under the name God of Revival. Lake spoke of the single, saying "Praise isn’t just something we give as a gift to God, it’s something that can make things shift—it’s a weapon. Even if it doesn’t change the situation, praise can shift my perspective. It can take my eyes off the storm and put them on Christ." 

The studio version of "We Praise You" was released in digital format on March 27, 2020. The song impacted Christian radio stations on May 15, 2020.

Composition

Commercial performance
"We Praise You" debuted at number 48 on the US Christian Airplay chart. The song went on to peak at number 46 and has spent a total of eight consecutive weeks on the chart.

Music video
Bethel Music released the live music video of "We Praise You" with Brandon Lake leading the song during the WorshipU 2019 conference held at Bethel Church through their YouTube channel on March 6, 2020.

Track listing

Charts

Release history

Other versions
 On January 10, 2020, Matt Redman released his rendition of "We Praise You" featuring Brandon Lake on his album, Let There Be Wonder (2020).

References

External links
  on PraiseCharts

2020 singles
Bethel Music songs
Brandon Lake songs
Songs written by Brandon Lake